Kurer Tadzhikistana is a social and political weekly newspaper published in Tajikistan. It is one of the most widely circulated papers in the country. It is written in the Russian language.

References

Publications with year of establishment missing
Russian-language newspapers published in Tajikistan
Weekly newspapers